The Burning Secret is a 1933 Austrian-German drama film directed by Robert Siodmak and starring Alfred Abel, Hilde Wagener and Hans Joachim Schaufuß. It was based on the novella of the same title by Stefan Zweig. It was released by the German branch of Universal Pictures. It was shot at the EFA Studios in Berlin with sets designed by the art director.

Because of its theme of adultery, the film was attacked by Joseph Goebbels, the Nazi Propaganda Minister. The film was remade in 1988.

Cast
 Alfred Abel as Der Mann
 Hilde Wagener as Die Frau
 Hans Joachim Schaufuß as Edgar
 Lucie Höflich as Mutter der Frau
 Willi Forst as Herr von Haller, Rennfahrer
 Ernst Dumcke as Baron Tosse
 Alfred Beierle as Müller, Hoteldetektiv
 Hans Richter as Fritz, Page
 Rina Marsa as Fräulein de la Roche
 Heinz Berghaus as Hotelportier
 Lotte Stein as Frau Klappholz

References

Bibliography 
 Alpi, Deborah Lazaroff. Robert Siodmak: A Biography, with Critical Analyses of His Films Noirs and a Filmography of All His Works. McFarland, 1998.
 Hake, Sabine. Popular Cinema of the Third Reich. University of Texas Press, 2001.
 Klaus, Ulrich J. Deutsche Tonfilme: Jahrgang 1933. Klaus-Archiv, 1988.
 Reimer, Robert C. & Reimer, Carol J. The A to Z of German Cinema. Scarecrow Press, 2010.

External links 
 

1933 films
1933 drama films
Austrian drama films
German drama films
Films of the Weimar Republic
1930s German-language films
Films directed by Robert Siodmak
Films based on short fiction
Films based on works by Stefan Zweig
Remakes of German films
Sound film remakes of silent films
Films set in hotels
Adultery in films
Universal Pictures films
German black-and-white films
Austrian black-and-white films
1930s German films
Films shot at Halensee Studios